Diploglossus monotropis is a species of lizard of the Diploglossidae family. It is found in Costa Rica, Panama, Colombia, and Nicaragua.

References

Diploglossus
Reptiles described in 1820
Reptiles of Costa Rica
Reptiles of Panama
Reptiles of Nicaragua
Reptiles of Colombia
Taxa named by Heinrich Kuhl